Oleksandr Miroshnychenko (born 19 January 1986 in Luhansk) is a retired Ukrainian professional footballer. He played as a midfielder.

External links
 

1986 births
Living people
Ukrainian footballers
Association football midfielders
Ukrainian expatriate footballers
Expatriate footballers in Belarus
Expatriate footballers in Estonia
FC Shakhtar Donetsk players
FC Shakhtar-2 Donetsk players
FC Shakhtar-3 Donetsk players
FC Dynamo Brest players
Pärnu JK Vaprus players
FC Volyn Lutsk players
Footballers from Luhansk
Ukrainian expatriate sportspeople in Belarus
Ukrainian expatriate sportspeople in Estonia